The 2018 International Champions Cup (or ICC) was the sixth edition of a tournament comprising a series of friendly association football matches. It began on July 20 and ended on August 11. The tournament was won by English club Tottenham Hotspur.

Teams
A total of 18 teams participated in the tournament. The participants were announced in four waves on April 10, 11, 12, and 17, 2018. On June 18, Lyon replaced Sevilla in the competition.

Venues
Originally 22 venues for the International Champions Cup were announced on April 13 and 17, 2018, but they were later increased to 23. Of these, 15 were in the United States, 7 were in Europe, and 1 was in Asia.

After Sevilla had to pull out (replaced by Lyon), matches due to take place in Warsaw and Zürich were canceled and replaced by matches in London and Faro-Loulé. The two matches Chelsea played were relocated from Gothenburg and Solna to Nice and Dublin respectively.

Matches
The match schedule was announced on April 17, 2018, and was updated on June 18 after Lyon replaced Sevilla. Each team played three matches, for a total of 27 matches.

Table
The 18 teams were ranked based on results from their three matches, with the best-ranked team being crowned champions. In addition to three points for a win and none for a loss, a penalty shoot-out win was worth two points, while a loss on penalties earned one point.

Media coverage

See also
2018 Women's International Champions Cup

References

External links

2018
2018 in American soccer
2018 in Singaporean football
July 2018 sports events in the United States
July 2018 sports events in Europe
July 2018 sports events in Asia
August 2018 sports events in the United States
August 2018 sports events in Europe